Keith Rosenkranz is a retired American fighter pilot and author. As a captain in the United States Air Force, he flew 30 missions in an F-16 Fighting Falcon during the Persian Gulf War. He later wrote a book about his experiences in the war, titled Vipers in the Storm: Diary of a Gulf War Fighter Pilot, which included a foreword from Vice President Dick Cheney. Rosenkranz was interviewed twice by CNN prior to the Iraq War. After nearly nine years, he left the military and became a longtime Delta Air Lines pilot (for 17 years as of 2009). He wrote an article for the New York Times about the Tarnak Farm incident and has been quoted in newspapers regarding other aerial accidents.

Bibliography

References

United States Air Force officers
American military writers
Year of birth missing (living people)
Living people